Wyatt Cenac's Problem Areas was an American documentary television series hosted by Wyatt Cenac. It premiered on April 13, 2018, on HBO. The series is executive produced by Cenac, Ezra Edelman, John Oliver, Tim Greenberg, David Martin, James Taylor, Jon Thoday and head writer Hallie Haglund. A second season began broadcasting on April 5, 2019. On June 7 of that year, the series was cancelled.

The show takes "a satirical look at social and cultural issues from Cenac's unique perspective. Rather than sit behind a desk, he will undertake a journey to understand some of the big issues of the moment and investigate real-world solutions".

Production
On October 16, 2017, it was announced that HBO had given a series order to a new documentary television series presented by Wyatt Cenac. The series order was for a first season consisting of ten episodes in which Cenac would executive produce alongside Ezra Edelman, John Oliver, Tim Greenberg, David Martin, James Taylor, Jon Thoday, and head writer Hallie Haglund. Production companies involved in the series were slated to consist of Avalon Television.

On March 8, 2018, it was announced that the series had been titled Wyatt Cenac's Problem Areas and that it would premiere on April 13, 2018. On May 22, 2018, it was announced that HBO had renewed the series for a second season.

Episodes

Season 1 (2018)

Season 2

Release

On March 8, 2018, HBO released a promotional poster. A day later, the first trailer for the series was released.

Reception

Critical response
In a positive review, The A.V. Clubs Danette Chavez called the show, "pointedly funny, and a necessary addition to late-night." She went on to offer the show praise and described its outlook saying, "Cenac's not interested in preaching to the choir or rehashing liberal talking points. The loose structure of the show—there's no real monologue, but there are segments and cheeky, animated asides—mirrors Cenac's desire to map out a blueprint for change. He knows this means there will be a few, if not many, wrong turns and dead ends, but he's not afraid to admit he doesn't have all the answers." In a more mixed review, Matt Zoller Seitz of Vulture called the show a "mixed bag" and said that Cenac comes across like "a man ranting alone in a basement rec room."

Awards and nominations

References

External links

2010s American documentary television series
2018 American television series debuts
2019 American television series endings
English-language television shows
HBO original programming